The Hessian Powder Magazine, also known as the Hessian Guardhouse Museum, is an historic guardhouse and gunpowder magazine which is located on the grounds of the Carlisle Barracks in Carlisle, Cumberland County, Pennsylvania.

It was added to the National Register of Historic Places in 1974.

History and architectural features
Built in 1777, the Hessian Powder Magazine is a stone walled structure, which is lined with interior brick. It measures seventy feet by thirty-two feet with walls that are four-and-one-half-feet thick. It also has a vaulted stone roof, which is covered by timbers and tin, creating a gable form.

Tradition says that Hessian prisoners of war, who were captured during the Battle of Trenton were sent to Carlisle, and used to build this guard house, which was originally a magazine. It may have first been used as a guardhouse during the 1870s, and also as part of the Carlisle Indian Industrial School (1879–1918).

Afterwards, it was used as a quartermaster and medical supply storehouse, filmstrip laboratory, message center, and U.S. post office.

It was designated a museum in 1948.

It was added to the National Register of Historic Places in 1974.

References

External links
 History and information - US Army Heritage and Education Center

Military facilities on the National Register of Historic Places in Pennsylvania
Museums in Cumberland County, Pennsylvania
Government buildings completed in 1777
Buildings and structures in Cumberland County, Pennsylvania
Military and war museums in Pennsylvania
American Revolutionary War museums in Pennsylvania
National Register of Historic Places in Cumberland County, Pennsylvania
Gunpowder magazines
Carlisle Indian Industrial School